The 2015–16 All-Ireland Junior Club Football Championship was the 15th staging of the All-Ireland Junior Club Football Championship since its establishment by the Gaelic Athletic Association.

The All-Ireland final was played on 6 February 2016 at Croke Park in Dublin, between Templenoe and Ardnaree Sarsfields. Templenoe won the match by 4-13 to 1-10 to claim their first ever championship title.

All-Ireland Junior Club Football Championship

All-Ireland final

References

2015 in Irish sport
2016 in Irish sport
All-Ireland Junior Club Football Championship
All-Ireland Junior Club Football Championship